Alexander Mann Jerome Wood (January 10, 1909 – April 4, 1979) was a professional ice hockey goaltender who played in one National Hockey League game for the New York Americans during the 1936–37 season, on January 31, 1937 against  the Montreal Canadiens. The rest of his career, which lasted from 1930 to 1945, was spent in various minor leagues. Wood was born in Falkirk, Scotland, but grew up in Regina, Saskatchewan.

Career statistics

Regular season and playoffs

See also
 List of players who played only one game in the NHL
 List of National Hockey League players from the United Kingdom

External links

1909 births
1979 deaths
Boston Cubs players
Buffalo Bisons (AHL) players
Buffalo Bisons (IHL) players
Canadian expatriate ice hockey players in the United States
Canadian ice hockey goaltenders
Cleveland Falcons players
Cleveland Indians (IHL) players
Ice hockey people from Saskatchewan
Minneapolis Millers (AHA) players
New Haven Eagles players
New York Americans players
Philadelphia Arrows players
Providence Reds players
Quebec Castors players
Regina Pats players
Rochester Cardinals players
St. Louis Flyers (AHA) players
Sportspeople from Falkirk
Sportspeople from Regina, Saskatchewan